Admiral Tin Aung San (born 16 October 1960) is a Burmese military officer who is currently serving as Deputy Prime Minister of Myanmar , member of State Administration Council and the Minister of Transport and Communications.

Career
He graduated from the Defence Services Academy in 1982 as part of the 23rd intake. Tin Aung San was promoted as Commander-in-Chief of the Myanmar Navy in August 2015, succeeding Admiral Thura Thet Swe, who retired to run for political office.

Subsequently, he was appointed as a members of the SAC on 2 February 2021, in the aftermath of the 2021 Myanmar coup d'état. Shortly, he left the position of the Commander-in-Chief of the Navy.

On the following day (3 February 2021), he was appointed as the Minister of Transport and Communications by the SAC. In this regard, the Committee Representing Pyidaungsu Hluttaw claims that the military regime’s cabinet is illegitimate.

Sanctions
The U.S. Department of the Treasury has imposed sanctions on "Tin Aung San" since 11 February 2021, pursuant to Executive Order 14014, in response to the Burmese military’s coup against the democratically elected civilian government of Burma. The US sanctions include freezing of assets under the US and ban on transactions with US person.

The Government of Canada has imposed sanctions on him since 18 February 2021, pursuant to Special Economic Measures Act and Special Economic Measures (Burma) Regulations, in response to the gravity of the human rights and humanitarian situation in Myanmar (formerly Burma). Canadian sanctions include freezing of assets under Canada and ban on transactions with Canadian person.

Furthermore, the British Government placed sanctions on him on 25 February 2021, following the recent military coup. The UK sanctions include The UK sanctions include freezing of assets under the UK and ban on traveling or transiting to the United Kingdom.

Personal life
He is married to Tin Tin Aye, and has one daughter, Yin Min Thu (b. 1989).

See also 
 State Administration Council
 Tatmadaw

References 

Living people
Burmese generals
1960 births
Government ministers of Myanmar
Transport ministers of Myanmar
Members of the State Administration Council
Specially Designated Nationals and Blocked Persons List
Defence Services Academy alumni
Individuals related to Myanmar sanctions